Lagoa e Carvoeiro is a civil parish in the municipality of Lagoa, Portugal. It was formed in 2013 by the merger of the former parishes Lagoa and Carvoeiro. The population in 2011 was 9,987, in an area of 39.13 km².
 
The offices of the freguesia are in part of the Convent of Saint Joseph.

Description
The historical centre of the civil parish consists of rows of white houses, where broad and narrow streets are intermixed, revealing modern buildings and old houses, some dating from before the Earthquake of 1755.

In the same historical center are found old doors and Manueline windows, four-sided roofs and arches spanning narrow lanes, and the vestiges of buildings which have long disappeared.

In Lagoa it is possible to find 18th-century buildings as well as modern ones, historical monuments, and contemporary sculptures which show how the city has evolved into a harmonious weaving of many threads.

Historic sites
 Church of Our Lady of Light
 Convent of Saint Joseph
 Convent of Our Lady of Mount Carmel

References

External links
 O portal da Freguesia de Lagoa

Parishes of Lagoa, Algarve
Towns in Portugal